Mikhaylovsky (masculine) or Mikhaylovskaya (feminine) is a surname of Slavic origin. It is shared by the following people:
Elena Mikhailovskaya (1949–1995), former World champion in international draughts
Konstantin Mikhailovsky (1834–1909), Russian engineer
Maksim Mikhailovsky (born 1969), Russian ice hockey player
Nikolay Mikhaylovsky (1842–1904), Russian publicist, literary critic, and sociologist
Stoyan Mikhaylovsky (1856–1927), Bulgarian writer

See also
Nikolai Garin-Mikhailovsky (1852–1906), Russian writer and engineer

Bulgarian-language surnames
Russian-language surnames
Ukrainian-language surnames